Castlefield Congregational Chapel is a building located at 378 Deansgate, Manchester, England. The building originally opened as a Congregational chapel in 1858, and was designed by the local architect Edward Walters. It has been designated by English Heritage as a Grade II listed building.  It is located in Castlefield, an Urban Heritage Park.

The building was converted to a sound recording studio in the 1980s and owned by Pete Waterman, best known for Stock Aitken Waterman. Rick Astley recorded "Never Gonna Give You Up" in the chapel. Waterman sold the building in 2006 and it has since been converted to offices.

See also

Listed buildings in Manchester-M3

References

Congregational churches in England
Churches in Manchester
Former churches in England
Recording studios in Greater Manchester
Gothic Revival church buildings in Greater Manchester
Grade II listed churches in Manchester
Edward Walters buildings